The Family Coalition Party of Ontario is a socially conservative party in Ontario, Canada.  The party ran fifty-one candidates in the 2003 Ontario provincial election, none of whom were elected.

This page also includes information about FCP candidates in subsequent by-elections.

List
Ancaster—Dundas—Flamborough—Aldershot: Michael Trolly
Barrie—Simcoe—Bradford: Roberto Sales
Brampton West—Mississauga: Paul Micelli
Bruce—Grey—Owen Sound: Linda Freiburger
Burlington: Vic Corvaro
Cambridge: Al Smith
Don Valley East: Ryan Kidd
Dufferin—Peel—Wellington—Grey: Dave Davies
Erie—Lincoln: Steve Elgersma
Etobicoke—Lakeshore: Ted Kupiec
Etobicoke North: Teresa Ceolin
Guelph—Wellington: Alan John McDonald
Haldimand—Norfolk—Brant: Barra Gots
Haliburton—Victoria—Brock: Paul Gordon
Halton: Giuseppe Gori
Hamilton East: Michael Izzotti
Hamilton Mountain: Eleanor Johnson
Hamilton West: Lynne Scime
Hastings—Frontenac—Lennox and Addington: John-Henry Westen
Huron—Bruce: Dave Joslin
Kingston and the Islands: Chris Beneteau
Kitchener—Waterloo: Lou Reitzel
Lanark—Carleton: Jim Gardiner
Leeds—Grenville: Melody Trolly
London North Centre: Craig Smith
Markham: Patrick Redmond
Mississauga Centre: John R. Lyall
Mississauga East: Gary Nail
Mississauga South: Alfred Zawadzki
Mississauga West: Charles Montano
Oakville: Theresa Tritt
Oshawa: Dave Chilvers
Ottawa South: John Pacheco
Oxford: Andre de Decker
Parkdale—High Park: Stan Grzywna
Parry Sound—Muskoka: Charlene Phinney
Perth—Middlesex: Pat Bannon
Peterborough: Max Murray
Sault Ste. Marie: Allan Walker
Scarborough—Agincourt: Tony Ieraci
Scarborough Centre: Joseph Internicola
Scarborough—Rouge River: Mitchell Persaud
Scarborough Southwest: Ray Scott
Simcoe—Grey: Steven J. Taylor
Simcoe North: Blaine Matthew Scott
St. Catharines: Linda Klassen
Toronto—Danforth: Masood Atchekzai
Waterloo—Wellington: Gord Truscott
Willowdale: Rina Morra
York North: Simone Williams
York South—Weston: Mariangela Sanabria

By-elections
Whitby—Ajax, March 30, 2006: Victor Carvalho

References

2003
Conservatism-related lists